The Brotherhood cemetery is an Imperial Russian military cemetery in Sevastopol. The Brotherhood cemetery was founded in 1854 as a temporary burial place for Russian soldiers and officers who were killed during the first siege of Sevastopol. 

Three burials were created according to order of admiral Vladimir Kornilov near the Northern fort of Sevastopol. Then the cemeteries were united because of severe casualties among the defenders of the besieged Russian city. It is approximated that there were buried from 100 000 to 127 000 of Russian military men.

The cemetery has 472 collective and 130 individual graves. The collective graves contain 50–100 or more bodies of soldiers. The individual graves contain bodies of officers.

There were buried famous Russian military commanders:
 Eduard Ivanovich Totleben,
 Stepan Khrulyov,
 Mikhail Dmitrievich Gorchakov.

In 1870 in the upper part of the cemetery hill it was built a pyramidal Orthodox Saint Nicholas church. The inner part of the church is covered with plates containing the names of Russian officers killed during the siege. The outer walls of the church contain plates with names of all regiments and military units who defended the city, with the information about dates and casualties in every unit.

The cemetery hill served as a place for a command post of the 4th defence sector of the besieged Soviet troops during the second siege of Sevastopol (1941–1942). The cemetery has been severely bombarded and then turned into a battle place between the Red Army and Nazi Germany troops. Saint Nicholas Church and the cemetery itself were partially destroyed.

After the fighting the cemetery was expanded with the graves of Soviet soldiers killed in World War II actions and killed with the sinking of Soviet battleship Novorossiysk (1955).

See also 
 Admirals' Burial Vault

References

External links 
 Севастополь. Братское кладбище участников первой Севастопольской обороны
 Братское кладбище
  Братское кладбище защитников Севастополя 1854–1855 годов – Севастополь
 

Military cemeteries
Eastern Orthodox cemeteries
Crimean War
Buildings and structures in Sevastopol
1854 establishments in the Russian Empire
Eastern Orthodoxy in Ukraine